The Medvedkovo Constituency (No.200) is a Russian legislative constituency in Moscow. It is based in North-Eastern Moscow.

Members elected

Election results

1993

|-
! colspan=2 style="background-color:#E9E9E9;text-align:left;vertical-align:top;" |Candidate
! style="background-color:#E9E9E9;text-align:left;vertical-align:top;" |Party
! style="background-color:#E9E9E9;text-align:right;" |Votes
! style="background-color:#E9E9E9;text-align:right;" |%
|-
|style="background-color:"|
|align=left|Viktor Mironov
|align=left|Independent
|42,616
|19.14%
|-
|style="background-color:"|
|align=left|Yevgeny Kozhokin
|align=left|Independent
| -
|14.93%
|-
| colspan="5" style="background-color:#E9E9E9;"|
|- style="font-weight:bold"
| colspan="3" style="text-align:left;" | Total
| 222,598
| 100%
|-
| colspan="5" style="background-color:#E9E9E9;"|
|- style="font-weight:bold"
| colspan="4" |Source:
|
|}

1995

|-
! colspan=2 style="background-color:#E9E9E9;text-align:left;vertical-align:top;" |Candidate
! style="background-color:#E9E9E9;text-align:left;vertical-align:top;" |Party
! style="background-color:#E9E9E9;text-align:right;" |Votes
! style="background-color:#E9E9E9;text-align:right;" |%
|-
|style="background-color:"|
|align=left|Georgy Boos
|align=left|Independent
|57,687
|20.86%
|-
|style="background-color:"|
|align=left|Viktor Mironov (incumbent)
|align=left|Independent
|39,086
|14.13%
|-
|style="background-color:"|
|align=left|Konstantin Zhukov
|align=left|Communist Party
|33,192
|12.00%
|-
|style="background-color:"|
|align=left|Vladimir Novikov
|align=left|Independent
|19,378
|7.01%
|-
|style="background-color:"|
|align=left|Igor Toporovsky
|align=left|Independent
|16,158
|5.84%
|-
|style="background-color:"|
|align=left|Vitaly Skutsky
|align=left|Independent
|10,881
|3.93%
|-
|style="background-color:"|
|align=left|Olga Litavrina
|align=left|Education - Future of Russia
|10,557
|3.82%
|-
|style="background-color:"|
|align=left|Mikhail Larin
|align=left|Independent
|8,081
|2.92%
|-
|style="background-color:"|
|align=left|Yelena Grigoryeva
|align=left|Independent
|6,496
|2.35%
|-
|style="background-color:"|
|align=left|Sergey Komkov
|align=left|Independent
|6,159
|2.23%
|-
|style="background-color:"|
|align=left|Vladimir Ulas
|align=left|Independent
|6,120
|2.21%
|-
|style="background-color:"|
|align=left|Mikhail Varfolomeev
|align=left|Liberal Democratic Party
|5,662
|2.05%
|-
|style="background-color:"|
|align=left|Sergey Slabun
|align=left|Independent
|3,943
|1.43%
|-
|style="background-color:#000000"|
|colspan=2 |against all
|47,863
|17.30%
|-
| colspan="5" style="background-color:#E9E9E9;"|
|- style="font-weight:bold"
| colspan="3" style="text-align:left;" | Total
| 276,603
| 100%
|-
| colspan="5" style="background-color:#E9E9E9;"|
|- style="font-weight:bold"
| colspan="4" |Source:
|
|}

1999

|-
! colspan=2 style="background-color:#E9E9E9;text-align:left;vertical-align:top;" |Candidate
! style="background-color:#E9E9E9;text-align:left;vertical-align:top;" |Party
! style="background-color:#E9E9E9;text-align:right;" |Votes
! style="background-color:#E9E9E9;text-align:right;" |%
|-
|style="background-color:#3B9EDF"|
|align=left|Georgy Boos
|align=left|Fatherland – All Russia
|165,789
|56.15%
|-
|style="background-color:"|
|align=left|Konstantin Zhukov
|align=left|Communist Party
|25,245
|8.55%
|-
|style="background-color:"|
|align=left|Aleksandr Chadov
|align=left|Yabloko
|16,325
|5.53%
|-
|style="background-color:#1042A5"|
|align=left|Mikhail Anichkin
|align=left|Union of Right Forces
|16,177
|5.48%
|-
|style="background-color:"|
|align=left|Tatyana Sudets
|align=left|Liberal Democratic Party
|13,450
|4.55%
|-
|style="background-color:#FF4400"|
|align=left|Pyotr Svyatashov
|align=left|Andrey Nikolayev and Svyatoslav Fyodorov Bloc
|5,059
|1.71%
|-
|style="background-color:#084284"|
|align=left|Yury Lunkov
|align=left|Spiritual Heritage
|4,683
|1.59%
|-
|style="background-color:"|
|align=left|Viktor Mironov
|align=left|Independent
|3,520
|1.19%
|-
|style="background-color:"|
|align=left|Aleksandr Gorbenko
|align=left|Independent
|1,805
|0.61%
|-
|style="background-color:#000000"|
|colspan=2 |against all
|35,894
|12.16%
|-
| colspan="5" style="background-color:#E9E9E9;"|
|- style="font-weight:bold"
| colspan="3" style="text-align:left;" | Total
| 295,286
| 100%
|-
| colspan="5" style="background-color:#E9E9E9;"|
|- style="font-weight:bold"
| colspan="4" |Source:
|
|}

2003

|-
! colspan=2 style="background-color:#E9E9E9;text-align:left;vertical-align:top;" |Candidate
! style="background-color:#E9E9E9;text-align:left;vertical-align:top;" |Party
! style="background-color:#E9E9E9;text-align:right;" |Votes
! style="background-color:#E9E9E9;text-align:right;" |%
|-
|style="background-color:"|
|align=left|Georgy Boos (incumbent)
|align=left|United Russia
|154,890
|59.28%
|-
|style="background-color:"|
|align=left|Andrey Babushkin
|align=left|Yabloko
|23,744
|9.09%
|-
|style="background-color:#D50000"|
|align=left|Aleksandr Mironov
|align=left|Russian Communist Workers Party-Russian Party of Communists
|19,337
|7.40%
|-
|style="background-color:"|
|align=left|Valeriya Novodvorskaya
|align=left|Independent
|14,827
|5.67%
|-
|style="background-color:"|
|align=left|Vilenina Golitsyna
|align=left|Liberal Democratic Party
|5,408
|2.07%
|-
|style="background-color:"|
|align=left|Mikhail Kiptik
|align=left|Independent
|1,183
|0.45%
|-
|style="background-color:#000000"|
|colspan=2 |against all
|37,514
|14.36%
|-
| colspan="5" style="background-color:#E9E9E9;"|
|- style="font-weight:bold"
| colspan="3" style="text-align:left;" | Total
| 262,990
| 100%
|-
| colspan="5" style="background-color:#E9E9E9;"|
|- style="font-weight:bold"
| colspan="4" |Source:
|
|}

2006

|-
! colspan=2 style="background-color:#E9E9E9;text-align:left;vertical-align:top;" |Candidate
! style="background-color:#E9E9E9;text-align:left;vertical-align:top;" |Party
! style="background-color:#E9E9E9;text-align:right;" |Votes
! style="background-color:#E9E9E9;text-align:right;" |%
|-
|style="background-color:"|
|align=left|Leonid Govorov
|align=left|United Russia
|92,924
|72.90%
|-
|style="background-color:"|
|align=left|Dmitry Nikonov
|align=left|Independent
|9,211
|7.22%
|-
|style="background-color:"|
|align=left|Igor Dyakov
|align=left|Liberal Democratic Party
|8,508
|6.67%
|-
|style="background-color:#000000"|
|colspan=2 |against all
|14,213
|11.15%
|-
| colspan="5" style="background-color:#E9E9E9;"|
|- style="font-weight:bold"
| colspan="3" style="text-align:left;" | Total
| 127,454
| 100%
|-
| colspan="5" style="background-color:#E9E9E9;"|
|- style="font-weight:bold"
| colspan="4" |Source:
|
|}

2016

|-
! colspan=2 style="background-color:#E9E9E9;text-align:left;vertical-align:top;" |Candidate
! style="background-color:#E9E9E9;text-align:left;vertical-align:top;" |Party
! style="background-color:#E9E9E9;text-align:right;" |Votes
! style="background-color:#E9E9E9;text-align:right;" |%
|-
|style="background-color:"|
|align=left|Denis Parfenov
|align=left|Communist Party
|28,611
|19.11%
|-
|style="background-color:"|
|align=left|Sergey Dobrynin
|align=left|Liberal Democratic Party
|23,842
|15.93%
|-
|style="background-color:"|
|align=left|Andrey Babushkin
|align=left|Yabloko
|20,831
|13.92%
|-
|style="background-color:"|
|align=left|Oleg Mitvol
|align=left|The Greens
|19,776
|13.21%
|-
|style="background-color:"|
|align=left|Yulia Rublyova
|align=left|A Just Russia
|17,463
|11.67%
|-
|style="background:;"| 
|align=left|Vyacheslav Blinov
|align=left|Communists of Russia
|8,327
|5.56%
|-
|style="background:;"| 
|align=left|Dmitry Marinichev
|align=left|Party of Growth
|7,501
|5.01%
|-
|style="background:#00A650;"| 
|align=left|Fyodor Trakhanov
|align=left|Civilian Power
|7,282
|4.86%
|-
|style="background:"| 
|align=left|Aleksey Zheravlyov
|align=left|Patriots of Russia
|5,280
|3.53%
|-
|style="background:;"| 
|align=left|Kristina Grigorovich
|align=left|Civic Platform
|2,388
|1.60%
|-
| colspan="5" style="background-color:#E9E9E9;"|
|- style="font-weight:bold"
| colspan="3" style="text-align:left;" | Total
| 149,693
| 100%
|-
| colspan="5" style="background-color:#E9E9E9;"|
|- style="font-weight:bold"
| colspan="4" |Source:
|
|}

2021

|-
! colspan=2 style="background-color:#E9E9E9;text-align:left;vertical-align:top;" |Candidate
! style="background-color:#E9E9E9;text-align:left;vertical-align:top;" |Party
! style="background-color:#E9E9E9;text-align:right;" |Votes
! style="background-color:#E9E9E9;text-align:right;" |%
|-
|style="background-color: " |
|align=left|Dmitry Pevtsov
|align=left|Independent
|84,593
|38.23%
|-
|style="background-color: " |
|align=left|Denis Parfenov (incumbent)
|align=left|Communist Party
|58,042
|26.23%
|-
|style="background-color: " |
|align=left|Yury Zagrebnoy
|align=left|A Just Russia — For Truth
|17,911
|8.09%
|-
|style="background-color: " |
|align=left|Andrey Babushkin
|align=left|Yabloko
|12,389
|5.60%
|-
|style="background-color: " |
|align=left|Yevgeny Stepkin
|align=left|Liberal Democratic Party
|10,774
|4.87%
|-
|style="background-color: "|
|align=left|Yevgeny Zapotylok
|align=left|New People
|9,372
|4.24%
|-
|style="background: ;"| 
|align=left|Polina Anisimkova
|align=left|The Greens
|7,991
|3.61%
|-
|style="background: ;"| 
|align=left|Mikhail Velmakin
|align=left|Green Alternative
|5,451
|2.46%
|-
|style="background-color: " |
|align=left|Mikhail Orlov
|align=left|Communists of Russia
|4,998
|2.26%
|-
|style="background: ;"| 
|align=left|Andrey Arbuzov
|align=left|Civic Platform
|2,674
|1.21%
|-
| colspan="5" style="background-color:#E9E9E9;"|
|- style="font-weight:bold"
| colspan="3" style="text-align:left;" | Total
| 240,912
| 100%
|-
| colspan="5" style="background-color:#E9E9E9;"|
|- style="font-weight:bold"
| colspan="4" |Source:
|
|}

Notes

Sources
200. Медведковский одномандатный избирательный округ

References

Russian legislative constituencies
Politics of Moscow